Myriam Telemaque is a Seychellois politician who served as Seychelles' Minister of Employment, Immigration and Civil Status from 7 July 2017 until 3 November 2020. Prior to her appointment, she had served as principal secretary for Immigration and Civil Status and chief immigration officer in the Department of Immigration under the Ministry of Affairs.

References

Living people
Women government ministers of Seychelles
People from Mont Fleuri
United Seychelles Party politicians
Year of birth missing (living people)